Fábio Rui Amorim Oliveira (born 23 January 1994) is a Portuguese footballer who plays for Lourinhanense as a midfielder.

Football career
On 27 July 2013, Oliveira made his professional debut with Atlético in a 2013–14 Taça da Liga match against Académico de Viseu, when he replaced Mauro Antunes (89th minute). In the first match of the  2013–14 Segunda Liga season against Sporting B on the 11 August, he made his league debut.

References

External links

Stats and profile at LPFP

1994 births
Living people
Portuguese footballers
Association football midfielders
Liga Portugal 2 players
Atlético Clube de Portugal players
Footballers from Lisbon